Eugene Garin (30 November 1922, Odesa, Ukrainian Soviet Socialist Republic – 14 June 1994, California, United States) was a contemporary seascape artist. Born in Odessa, Ukraine, (under USSR at the time) Garin was the most influential seascape artist. He spawned and inspired many of today's great seascape artists through his tremendous talent and imagination. Garin was best known for his rendition of the transparent wave. Influenced by the Russian painter Peter Effremovich Fedatov during his youth in Odessa, Ukraine and later by the works of I. K. Aivazowsky, Garin has combined the traditional beauty of European art with contemporary techniques developed by his own hand. With a prominent career extending over four decades, he broke through barriers in seascape painting technique that had restrained artists for years.

Using texture and a variety of translucent glazes, Garin created compositions that are bold, yet controlled. His compositions are unique and varied, from shipwreck scenes, to romantic moonlit ocean breakers, to sun-drenched seascapes at dusk, to misty coastal coves. The sea is always the commanding force in his paintings, its rich beauty and vastness exemplifies in each composition. The vivid emotional impact which Garin creates excites the. imagination and stirs our inner desire to challenge its eternal domain.

Considered the patriarch of modern seascape art, his paintings hang in many major collections throughout the globe, including Canada, England, South America, South Africa, Japan, Mexico and Russia, as well as hundreds of American homes. Eugene Garin is an artist who appeals to both the novice collector and the connoisseur. He is listed in Who's Who in California and the American Art Analog. Garin has artwork in the permanent collection of the Russian consulate in San Francisco along with the Presidential Palace in Panama. Garin has been featured in national magazines and his works have been on tour around the world for public display. Admired by art critics and his contemporaries, Garin is assured a place in history.

References

1922 births
1994 deaths
Artists from Odesa
20th-century Ukrainian painters
20th-century Ukrainian male artists
20th-century Russian male artists
20th-century Russian painters
Russian male painters
Marine artists
Ukrainian male painters
Soviet painters
Soviet emigrants to the United States